David Clark Lee (born 1950) is an American television producer, director, and writer. His best-known works are Cheers and Frasier.

Lee grew up in Claremont, California, and went to college at the University of Redlands. He co-wrote and co-produced The Jeffersons and Cheers with Peter Casey for, respectively, six and four years. He and Casey co-created Wings and Frasier alongside the late David Angell under the Grub Street Productions.

He produced revival productions of Broadway musicals, including South Pacific starring Brian Stokes Mitchell and Reba McEntire, Can-Can, and Camelot. He co-wrote a newly revised script of Can-Can alongside Joel Fields when he was reviving the old musical.

Lee has been nominated eighteen times for Primetime Emmy Awards; he won nine out of those nominations. He also won the Directors Guild Award, the Golden Globe Award, Producers Guild Award, GLAAD Media Award, British Comedy Award, three Television Critics Association Awards, two Humanitas Prizes, and the Peabody Award.

Personal life
Lee is openly gay.

He paid US$3 million in 2002 for a Palm Springs estate built by architect Donald Wexler and originally resided in by Dinah Shore. He sold the estate to real estate agents for $5,995,000 in 2009, later purchased by Leonardo DiCaprio in 2014 for $5,230,000.

References

External links

 

American male screenwriters
American television directors
American television producers
Primetime Emmy Award winners
Living people
American gay writers
Directors Guild of America Award winners
American television writers
Place of birth missing (living people)
University of Redlands alumni
Showrunners
LGBT producers
LGBT television directors
American male television writers
American theatre people
1950 births
21st-century LGBT people